Ligue 1, officially known as Ligue 1 Uber Eats for sponsorship reasons, is a French professional league for men's association football clubs. At the top of the French football league system, it is the country's primary football competition. Administrated by the Ligue de Football Professionnel, Ligue 1 is contested by 20 clubs and operates on a system of promotion and relegation from and to Ligue 2.

Seasons run from August to May. Clubs play two matches against each of the other teams in the league – one home and one away – totalling to 38 matches over the course of the season. Most games are played on Saturdays and Sundays, with a few games played during weekday evenings. Play is regularly suspended the last weekend before Christmas for two weeks before returning in the second week of January. As of 2021, Ligue 1 is one of the top national leagues, ranked fifth in Europe, behind England's Premier League, Spain's La Liga, Italy's Serie A and Germany's Bundesliga.

Ligue 1 was inaugurated on 11 September 1932 under the name National before switching to Division 1 after a year of existence. It continued to operate under that name until 2002, when it adopted its current name. Paris Saint-Germain and AS Saint-Étienne are the most successful clubs with ten league titles each, while Olympique Lyonnais is the club that has won the most consecutive titles (seven between 2002 and 2008). AS Saint-Étienne was the first club with ten titles. With the presence of 71 seasons in Ligue 1, Olympique de Marseille hold the record for most seasons among the elite, while Paris Saint-Germain hold the league record for longevity with 47 consecutive seasons (from 1974 to present). FC Nantes is the team with the longest consecutive unbeaten streak (32 matches) and the fewest number of defeats (one match) in a single season, doing so in the 1994–95 campaign. In addition, Nantes also holds the record for the longest time without losing at home, with a run of 92 matches from May 1976 to April 1981.

The current champions are Paris Saint-Germain, who won in the 2021–22 season. The league has been won on multiple occasions by foreign-based club AS Monaco, the presence of which within the league makes it a cross-border competition.

Ligue 1 has been scheduled for a reduction to 18 clubs before the 2023–24 season.

History

Foundation
Professionalism in French football did not exist until July 1930, when the National Council of the French Football Federation voted 128–20 in favour of its adoption. The founders of professionalism in French football are Georges Bayrou, Emmanuel Gambardella, and Gabriel Hanot. Professionalism was officially implemented in 1932.

In order to successfully create a professional football league in the country, the Federation limited the league to twenty clubs. In order to participate in the competition, clubs were subjected to three important criteria:

 The incoming club must have had positive results in the past.
 The incoming club must be able to pull in enough revenue to balance its finances.
 The incoming club must be able to successfully recruit at least eight professional players.

Many clubs disagreed with the subjective criteria, most notably Strasbourg, RC Roubaix, Amiens SC, and Stade Français, while others like Rennes, due to fear of bankruptcy, and Olympique Lillois, due to a conflict of interest, were reluctant to become professional. Olympique Lillois' president, Henri Jooris, also chairman of the Ligue du Nord, feared his league would fold and proposed it become the second division of the new league. Eventually, many clubs earned professional status, though it became more difficult to convince clubs in the northern half of the country; Strasbourg, RC Roubaix, and Amiens refused to accept the new league, while conversely Mulhouse, Excelsior AC Roubaix, Metz, and Fives accepted professionalism. In southern France, clubs such as Olympique de Marseille, Hyères, SO Montpellier, SC Nîmes, Cannes, Antibes, and Nice were extremely supportive of the new league and accepted their professional status without argument.

Establishment

The league's inaugural season of the all-professional league, called National, was held in 1932–1933. The 20 inaugural members of National were Antibes, CA Paris, Cannes, Club Français, Excelsior AC Roubaix, Fives, Hyères, Marseille, Metz, Mulhouse, Nice, Nîmes, Olympique Alès, Olympique Lillois, Racing Club de France, Red Star Olympique, Rennes, Sochaux, Sète, and Montpellier. The 20 clubs were inserted into two groups of 10 with the bottom three of each group suffering relegation to Division 2. The two winners of each group would then face each other in a final held at a neutral venue, which later turned out to the Stade Olympique Yves-du-Manoir. The first final was held on 14 May 1933 and it matched the winner of Group A, Olympique Lillois, against the runner-up of Group B, Cannes. Antibes, the winner of Group B, was supposed to take part in the final but was suspected of bribery by the French Football Federation and was disqualified. In the first final, Lillois were crowned the inaugural champions following the club's 4–3 victory. After the season, the league decided to retain the 14 clubs and not promote any sides from the second division. The league also agreed to change its name from National to simply Division 1. For the 1934–35 season, the league organised a legitimate promotion and relegation system bringing the total tally of clubs in the first division to 16. The number remained until the 1938–39 season.

Because of World War II, football was suspended by the French government and the Ligue de Football Professionnel, although its member clubs continued playing in regional competitions. During the "war championships", as they are called, professionalism was abolished by the Vichy regime and clubs were forced to participate in regional leagues, designated as Zone Sud and Zone Nord. Due to its non-association with the two leagues, the LFP and FFF do not recognise the championships won by the clubs and thus 1939–1945 is non-existent in the two organisations' view. Following the conclusion of the war and the liberation of France, professional football returned to France. The first division increased its allotment of clubs to 18. This number remained until the 1965–66 season when the number was increased to 20. In 2002, the league changed its name from Division 1 to Ligue 1.

Format 

 20 clubs: 1932–1933
 14 clubs: 1933–1934
 16 clubs: 1934–1939
 18 clubs: 1945–1946
 20 clubs: 1946–1947
 18 clubs: 1947–1958
 20 clubs: 1958–1963
 18 clubs: 1963–1965
 20 clubs: 1965–1968
 18 clubs: 1968–1970
 20 clubs: 1970–1997
 18 clubs: 1997–2002
 20 clubs: 2002–2023
 18 clubs: 2023–

Competition format

There are 20 clubs in Ligue 1. During the course of a season, usually from August to May, each club plays the others twice, once at their home stadium and once at that of their opponents, for a total of 38 games, though special circumstances may allow a club to host matches at other venues such as when Lille hosted Lyon at the Stade de France in 2007 and 2008. Teams receive three points for a win and one point for a draw. No points are awarded for a loss. Teams are ranked by total points, then goal difference, and then goals scored. At the end of each season, the club with the most points is crowned champion. If points are equal, the goal difference and then goals scored determine the winner. If still equal, teams are deemed to occupy the same position. If there is a tie for the championship, for relegation, or for qualification to other competitions, a play-off match at a neutral venue decides rank. For the 2015–16 season only, 2 teams were to be relegated and only 2 teams from Ligue 2 were to be promoted, but this decision was overturned and 3 teams were relegated and 3 teams promoted.
Thus, it was the 2016–17 season which saw the return of a relegation play-off between the 18th-placed Ligue 1 team and the 3rd-placed team in the Ligue 2 on a two-legged confrontation, with the Ligue 2 team hosting the first game.

Previously, the league utilised a different promotion and relegation format. Prior to 1995, the league's format was direct relegation of the bottom two teams and a play-off between the third-last first-division team and the winner of the second-division play-offs, similar to the Dutch Eredivisie, and the German Bundesliga. The league has also experimented with a "bonus" rule. From 1973 to 1976, a rule rewarded teams scoring three or more goals in a game with one extra point, regardless of outcome, with the objective of encouraging offensive play. The experience was ultimately inconclusive. At the start of the 2006–07 season, the league introduced an Attacking Play Table to encourage the scoring of more goals in Ligue 1 and Ligue 2. The LFP, with the help of the former manager Michel Hidalgo introduced the idea to reward those teams who score the most goals. The table was similar to the previous idea, but was independent from the official league table and clubs were only rewarded with monetary bonuses.

In June 2021, the LFP voted overwhelmingly at its general assembly to contract Ligue 1 back to 18 clubs for the 2023–24 season by relegating four to, and promoting two from, Ligue 2 after 2022–23.

European qualification
As of the 2022–23 season, as determined by the UEFA coefficient, the top three teams in Ligue 1 qualify for the Champions League, with the top two proceeding directly to the group phase. The third-placed team enters in the third qualifying round. The fourth-placed team qualifies for the UEFA Europa League, the fifth for UEFA Europa Conference League. The last Europa League place is determined through the country's domestic cup competition, the Coupe de France. If the cup winner qualifies for Europe through their league position, the sixth-placed team in Ligue 1 will qualify for the Europa League.

Clubs

A total of 74 clubs have played in Ligue 1 from its foundation in the 1932–33 season to the start of the 2021–22 season. Currently, Marseille, Montpellier, Nice and Rennes are the only founding members of the league to be playing in Ligue 1. Paris Saint-Germain is the only club to have not suffered points relegation. They earned promotion to the first division for the 1974–75 season and have not faltered down since. Paris Saint-Germain was administratively relegated by the league following its split from Paris FC in 1972, but returned to the top flight two seasons later.

Internationally, the most well-known Ligue 1 clubs include Paris Saint-Germain, Olympique de Marseille, Olympique Lyonnais, AS Monaco and Lille OSC.

Members for 2022–23
The following 20 clubs are competing in the 2022–23 Ligue 1 season.

Finances
Ligue 1 clubs' finances and budgets are managed by the DNCG (Direction Nationale du Contrôle de Gestion), an organisation responsible for monitoring the accounts of professional association football clubs in France. It was founded in 1984 and is an administrative directorate of the Ligue de Football Professionnel (LFP). The mission of the DNCG is to oversee all financial operations of the 44 member clubs of the LFP, develop the resources of professional clubs, apply sanctions to those clubs breaking the rules of operation, defend the morals and interests of French football in general.

Following a report by the DNCG, it was determined that the combined budget of Ligue 1 clubs was €910 million for the 2005–06 season, a 39% increase from the 2002–03 season. The prominent reason for the rise was mainly associated with the television rights deal the league regularly signs. Excluding Paris Saint-Germain, many of the top division clubs are extremely healthy with clubs such as Auxerre, Bordeaux, Lille, and Lyon being referred to as "managed to perfection". However, recently the DNCG has encouraged clubs to concentrate on limiting their "skyrocketing wage bills and the magnitude of their debts" after it was discovered that the LFP clubs accounts as a whole were in the red for the third consecutive season (2008–2011) with an estimated deficit of €130 million. In 2012, the LFP announced that the clubs deficit had been cut in half from €130 million to €65 million. Ligue 1 ranks fifth in terms of revenue brought in by clubs with the league bringing in £0.6 billion for the 2006–07 season trailing England, Italy, Spain, and Germany.

In terms of world football, clubs Lyon and Marseille are among the richest football clubs in the world and regularly feature in the Deloitte Football Money League ranking of football clubs by revenue generated from football operations. In the list compiled in the 2008–09 season Lyon ranked 13th among clubs generating approximately €139.6 million, while Marseille were right behind them in 14th position generating €133.2 million.

In 2016, just Paris St.-Germain was in the top 30 of the Deloitte Football Money League (ranked 4). From 2017 to 2020, Paris St.-Germain (ranked between 5 and 7) and Lyon (ranked between 17 and 28) were part of the top 30.

Performance by club

Bold indicates clubs playing in 2022–23 Ligue 1.

Notes

Records

Appearances

Notes

Goalscorers

Notes

Media coverage

Currently Ligue 1 matches in France air on Canal+ and Amazon Prime.

Formally, in France, the Ligue de Football Professionnel had an exclusive broadcasting agreement with premium pay TV channels, Canal+ and beIN Sports. The latter channel is operated by Qatar-based broadcaster Al Jazeera. The agreement with Al Jazeera, reached on 23 June 2011, pays the LFP €510 million over four seasons. Following the announcement of the agreement, it was revealed that Canal+ had acquired four television packages, while beIN Sports acquired two packages.

In 2018, Mediapro acquired three of the four major packages of LFP media rights for 2020-21 through 2024, largely replacing Canal+. beIN Sports maintained "lot 3", which contains two matches per-week on Saturday nights and Sunday afternoons. Mediapro was expected to establish a new channel to house these rights. beIN Sports later sub-licensed this package to Canal+. In June 2020, Mediapro announced a partnership with TF1 to brand the new channel as Téléfoot—an extension of TF1's long-running football programme of the same name. As part of the agreement, Téléfoot will leverage TF1 talent and resources, with the programme's hosts Grégoire Margotton and Bixente Lizarazu serving as the lead broadcast team for at least 20 matches per-season.

Seeking to renegotiate its contract due to the financial impact of COVID-19, Mediapro began withholding its rights payments to the LFP in October 2020. LFP CEO Arnaud Rouger stated in October 2020 that they may have to pursue a new broadcaster if they are unable to resolve the dispute with Mediapro. In December 2020, it was reported that Mediapro were preparing to wind down Téléfoot, after it agreed to compensate the LFP for the two missed rights payments. In February 2021, Canal+ reached an interim agreement to acquire the rights packages held by Mediapro for the remainder of the season, and later sub-licensed Ligue 2 to beIN; Téléfoot shut down on 8 February 2021.

In June 2021, Canal+ and Amazon Prime acquired the broadcast rights to Ligue 1.

Awards

Trophy

The current Ligue 1 trophy, L'Hexagoal, was developed by the Ligue de Football Professionnel and designed and created by Pablo Reinoso. The trophies has been awarded to the champion of France since the end of the 2006–07 season, replacing the previous Ligue 1 trophy that had existed for only five years. The name Hexagoal was derived from an official competition created by the LFP and French TV channel TF1 to determine a name for the new trophy. Over 9,000 proposals were sent in and, on 20 May 2007, French Football Federation member Frédéric Thiriez announced that, following an online vote, the term Hexagoal had received half of the votes. The first club to hoist the new trophy was Olympique Lyonnais who earned the honour after winning the 2007–08 season.

Monthly and annual

In addition to the winner's trophy and the individual winner's medal players receive, Ligue 1 also awards the monthly Player of the Month award. Following the season, the UNFP Awards are held and awards such as the Player of the Year, Manager of the Year, and Young Player of the Year from both Ligue 1 and Ligue 2 are handed out.

Sponsorship names

 Ligue 1 Orange (2002–2008)
 Ligue 1 Conforama (2017–2020)
 Ligue 1 Uber Eats (2020–present)

See also

 Football records in France
 List of football clubs in France
 List of foreign Ligue 1 players
 List of Ligue 1 broadcasters

Explanatory notes

References

External links

 Ligue1.fr (official website) 
 Ligue1.com (official website) 

 
1
France
1932 establishments in France
Sports leagues established in 1932
Professional sports leagues in France